Yesterday's Thoughts is an album by Art Farmer recorded in 1975 and originally released on the Japanese East Wind label.

Reception

Ken Dryden of AllMusic states, " Don't expect to find this long-unavailable LP quickly or at a bargain price, but it is well worth the effort to acquire it".

Track listing
 "What Are You Doing the Rest of Your Life?" (Alan and Marilyn Bergman, Michel Legrand) – 9:52
 "How Insensitive" (Antônio Carlos Jobim, Vinícius de Moraes) – 6:35
 "Namely You" (Gene de Paul, Johnny Mercer) – 5:58
 "Alone Together" (Howard Dietz, Arthur Schwartz) – 9:31
 "Yesterday's Thoughts" (Benny Golson) – 8:02
 "Firm Roots" (Cedar Walton) – 4:58

Personnel
Art Farmer – flugelhorn
Cedar Walton – piano
Sam Jones – bass
Billy Higgins – drums

References

East Wind Records albums
Art Farmer albums
1976 albums